Shave is both a print and online men's-lifestyle magazine created by Shave Media Group. The founder is Mike Zouhri. The magazine also syndicates content through news portals, such as MSN.

References

External links
Official website

Men's magazines published in Canada
Monthly magazines published in Canada
Online magazines published in Canada
Magazines established in 2008
Men's fashion magazines
Magazines published in Alberta
Mass media in Edmonton